Golden Ring may refer to:

Places
 Golden Ring of Russia, is a theme route over a ring of cities northeast of Moscow
 Golden Ring Hotel, hotel in Moscow
 Golden Ring Mall, shopping center in Rosedale, Maryland
 Golden Ring Middle School, school in Baltimore, Maryland, US

Music
 Golden Ring (album), a 1976 country album by George Jones and Tammy Wynette, released in 1976
 "Golden Ring" (song), a 1976 country song by George Jones and Tammy Wynette, released in 1976
 "Golden Ring" (song by Eric Clapton), song from the 1978 album Backless
 Zolotoe Koltso, a Russian band

Other uses
 a cultivar of Berberis thunbergii

See also
 Goldring (disambiguation)
 Gold ring (disambiguation)
 Golden Circle (disambiguation)
 Golden (disambiguation)
 Ring (disambiguation)